Bath Historic District may refer to:

 Bath Historic District (Bath, Maine), listed on the NRHP in Maine
 Bath Historic District (Bath, North Carolina), listed on the NRHP in North Carolina

See also
Bath (disambiguation)
For the World Heritage Site, see Bath, Somerset